Sa Anun Al Qadry (born November 18, 1980) is an Indonesian footballer who currently plays for Persiram Raja Ampat in the Indonesia Super League.

Club statistics

References

External links

1979 births
Association football defenders
Living people
Indonesian footballers
Liga 1 (Indonesia) players
Persiram Raja Ampat players
Indonesian Premier Division players